Westfield School is a private day school for girls aged 3 to 19 in Gosforth, Newcastle upon Tyne, England. It is a Round Square school and a member of the Girls' Schools Association.

History
Westfield School was founded in 1960 by a group of parents who saw the need for a new type of girls' independent school with a broader curriculum than those offered at the time by other Newcastle schools. They decided to establish a girls' school on the Gordonstoun model. Henry Brereton, a former Headmaster of Gordonstoun, was a founder trustee consultant and an adviser from the beginning. He remained a Governor of Westfield after retirement from Gordonstoun.

Miss Ellen Bicknell's Parents' National Education Union School, situated at 1 and 3 Westfield Grove, Gosforth, was purchased and became the Junior House. Demand for places grew rapidly. Within a year Oakfield House, the former home of local MP Sir Cecil Cochrane, was purchased for the Senior House.

Westfield continued to grow rapidly throughout the 1990s. It became a member of the international Round Square in 1991. In 1996 the acquisition of Ashfield Towers on Kenton Road, adjacent to Senior House, led to the relocation of Junior House allowing Westfield to offer an all-through education for girls from three to eighteen on a single six-acre site in the heart of Gosforth. The current school is now made up of three divisions: Junior House (which includes the Early Years), Senior House and Sixth Form.

Uniform
The school's uniform consists of a tartan blue and pink kilt with a pink shirt and a navy blue V-neck jumper, whilst the sixth form uniform consists of a navy suit along with the same pink and navy blue pullover as the rest of the school.

Programmes
As a Round Square school, Westfield frequently participates in exchange programmes and service projects with other member schools. Girls from most year groups have the opportunity to visit other Round Square schools. There are also opportunities for younger students to participate in Junior and Young Round Square conferences aimed specifically at their own age groups and usually held in the UK or Europe.

Extracurricular Activities
A wide variety of activities are available ranging from sport to interest clubs to performing arts. Outdoor pursuits for Duke of Edinburgh Award participants offers girls the opportunity to experience the outdoors through expeditions and camping trips.

Westfield is a member of UNESCO ASPNet. Hence girls may also take part in Amnesty International, Passport for Life and environmental awareness groups.

Notable former pupils
 Julia Barrow, historian and academic
 Sally-Ann Hart, politician
 Rose Ridley, wife of Owen Paterson, secretary of state

References

External links
School Website
Profile on MyDaughter
Profile on the ISC website

Private schools in Newcastle upon Tyne
Girls' schools in Tyne and Wear
Member schools of the Girls' Schools Association
Round Square schools